Ricardo Jorge Tavares Machado (born 13 September 1988) is a Portuguese professional footballer who plays for Al-Sahel SC (Saudi Arabia) as a centre-back.

Club career

Portugal
Born in Vila Nova de Gaia, Porto District, Machado spent the vast majority of his youth career with local S.C. Dragões Sandinenses. He made his debut as a senior in 2007 with A.D. Machico in the third division, signing with fellow league team C.S. Marítimo B after one season.

In the summer of 2010, Machado was loaned by C.S. Marítimo to C.D. Feirense of the Segunda Liga. He appeared in his first game as a professional on 12 September, starting in a 2–2 away draw against F.C. Arouca.

Romania
Machado competed in Romania and its Liga I the following years, starting out at FC Brașov. On 13 February 2015, he signed a two-and-a-half-year contract with FC Dinamo București of the same league.

Machado's first top-flight match occurred on 31 October 2011 while at the service of the former club, when he played the entire 1–2 home loss to CFR Cluj. His first goal was scored the following 4 May, helping the hosts defeat CSU Voința Sibiu 3–0.

In the 2012–13 campaign, Machado scored a career-best five goals for Brașov, helping the side to the seventh position.

Al Taawoun
Machado joined Saudi Professional League's Al Taawoun FC in 2015. On 5 December 2017, he agreed to a two-year extension.

In July 2020, Machado announced his decision to leave, citing a "need for a new challenge".

Later years
On 25 January 2021, aged 32, Machado returned to Portugal and its second tier by joining F.C. Penafiel on a short-term deal. After several months of inactivity, he signed with Académico de Viseu F.C. in the same level, reuniting with manager Pedro Ribeiro. 

Machado moved back to Saudi Arabia in July 2022, with Al-Sahel SC of the First Division League.

Honours
Al Taawoun
Kings Cup: 2019

References

External links

1988 births
Living people
Sportspeople from Vila Nova de Gaia
Portuguese footballers
Association football defenders
Liga Portugal 2 players
Segunda Divisão players
S.C. Dragões Sandinenses players
C.S. Marítimo players
C.D. Feirense players
F.C. Penafiel players
Académico de Viseu F.C. players
Liga I players
FC Brașov (1936) players
FC Dinamo București players
Saudi Professional League players
Saudi First Division League players
Al-Taawoun FC players
Al-Sahel SC (Saudi Arabia) players
Portuguese expatriate footballers
Expatriate footballers in Romania
Expatriate footballers in Saudi Arabia
Portuguese expatriate sportspeople in Romania
Portuguese expatriate sportspeople in Saudi Arabia